The fourth season of the sitcom Mom began airing on October 27, 2016 on CBS in the United States. The season is produced by Chuck Lorre Productions and Warner Bros. Television, with series creators Chuck Lorre, Eddie Gorodetsky and Gemma Baker serving as executive producer. The season concluded on May 11, 2017.

Christy (Anna Faris) has gone back to school and is pursuing her dream of becoming a lawyer, while Bonnie (Allison Janney) attempts to have a healthy romantic relationship with her boyfriend, Adam (William Fichtner), who was upgraded to series regular status for this season. Through it all, Christy and Bonnie rely on their support system from AA, including the wise Marjorie (Mimi Kennedy), the wealthy and sometimes misguided Jill (Jaime Pressly), and the overly emotional Wendy (Beth Hall). Collectively, they help each other stay sober in the face of whatever life throws at them. The episodes are usually titled with two odd topics that are mentioned in that episode. Season 4 marked the show's full revolution away from storylines involving Christy's children: daughter Violet (played by Sadie Calvano) only appeared in a handful of episodes, and son Roscoe (played by Blake Garrett Rosenthal) would make his final appearance ever on the show early on the season's run.

Season four of Mom aired Thursdays in the United States at 9:00 p.m. after The Great Indoors.

Cast

Main
 Anna Faris as Christy Plunkett
 Allison Janney as Bonnie Plunkett
 Mimi Kennedy as Marjorie Armstrong-Perugian
 Jaime Pressly as Jill Kendall
 Beth Hall as Wendy Harris
 William Fichtner as Adam Janikowski

Recurring
 Sadie Calvano as Violet Plunkett
 Matt Jones as Baxter
 Blake Garrett Rosenthal as Roscoe
 Lauri Johnson as Beatrice
 Don McManus as Steve Casper
 Jonny Coyne as Victor Perugian
 Amy Hill as Beverly Tarantino
 Mary Pat Gleason as Mary
 Leonard Roberts as Ray Stabler
 Spencer Daniels as Luke
 Sara Rue as Candace Hayes
 Charlie Robinson as Mr. Munson
 Julia Lester as Emily

Special guest stars
 Rosie O'Donnell as Jeanine
 Bradley Whitford as Mitch
 Nicole Sullivan as Leanne
 Chris Pratt as Nick Banaszak
 Wendie Malick as Danielle Janikowski
 Missi Pyle as Natasha

Guest stars
 Chris L. McKenna as Derek
 Jennifer Taylor as Alissa
 Diane Delano as Leslie
 Mary-Pat Green as Susie
 Tim Bagley as Dr. LaSalle
 Jack McGee as Frank
 Christina Moore as Camille
 Amy Farrington as June
 David James Elliott as Joe
 Bret Harrison as Brad
 John Benjamin Hickey as Dr. Sellers
 Yeardley Smith as Enid
 David Anthony Higgins as George

Episodes

Ratings

References

Mom (TV series)
2016 American television seasons
2017 American television seasons